Arthur Henderson, Baron Rowley,  (27 August 1893 – 28 August 1968) was a British Labour Party politician.

Early life and education
Arthur Henderson was the son of Arthur Henderson, who was Leader of the Labour Party between 1908 and 1910, 1914–17 and 1931–2. He was educated at the Central School, Darlington, Queen's College, Taunton, and Trinity Hall, Cambridge, where he graduated with honours degrees in Economics (MA) and Law (LLB). While at Cambridge he was chair of the university's Labour Club. In 1921 he was called to the bar, and in the same year was appointed Secretary of the University Labour Federation. At the 1922 general election he contested Portsmouth North in the Labour interest. He was appointed a King's Counsel in 1939.

Parliament
Henderson was first elected to the House of Commons at the 1923 general election, as Member of Parliament (MP) for the South Wales seat of Cardiff South. He lost his seat at the 1924 general election to the Conservative Arthur Evans, but won it back at the 1929 general election.

When Labour split at the 1931 election over Ramsay MacDonald's formation of a National Government, Henderson was one of the many Labour MPs to lose their seats. Evans was re-elected, and held the seat until the 1945 election, when he lost to future Prime Minister James Callaghan.

Henderson returned to Parliament at the 1935 general election, for the English constituency of Kingswinford in Staffordshire. He held that seat until its abolition for the 1950 general election, when he was elected for the new seat of Rowley Regis and Tipton, on the other side of Dudley. He was re-elected in Rowley Regis until his retirement from the Commons at the 1966 election. He was created a life peer on 27 May 1966 as Baron Rowley, of Rowley Regis in the County of Staffordshire. He died two years later, the day after his 75th birthday.

In government
In the World War II coalition government, he served as Under-Secretary of State for War from 1942 to 1943, and then as Financial Secretary to the War Office from 1943 until the coalition was dissolved in 1945 at the end of the war.

The 1945 general election saw Labour returned to government with a huge majority, and Henderson was appointed as junior minister at the India Office, with the title of Under-Secretary of State for India and Burma. When India gained its independence in 1947, the India Office was abolished, and Henderson was appointed as a Privy Counsellor and promoted to Secretary of State for Air, the ministry with responsibility for the Royal Air Force. He retained that post until Labour's defeat at the 1951 general election.

Later life and death
 
Henderson appeared as a contestant on the American television game show What's My Line? on 6 October 1957. He was cremated at Golders Green Crematorium upon his death in 1968.

Notes

References

External links 
 
 

1893 births
1968 deaths
Alumni of Trinity Hall, Cambridge
Rowley, Arthur Henderson, Baron
Labour Party (UK) MPs for English constituencies
Members of the Parliament of the United Kingdom for Cardiff constituencies
Members of the Privy Council of the United Kingdom
Ministers in the Attlee governments, 1945–1951
Ministers in the Churchill wartime government, 1940–1945
People educated at Queen's College, Taunton
UK MPs 1923–1924
UK MPs 1929–1931
UK MPs 1935–1945
UK MPs 1945–1950
UK MPs 1950–1951
UK MPs 1951–1955
UK MPs 1955–1959
UK MPs 1959–1964
UK MPs 1964–1966
UK MPs who were granted peerages
War Office personnel in World War II
Welsh Labour Party MPs
British Army personnel of World War II
British Army General List officers
British Army personnel of World War I
Life peers created by Elizabeth II